The Olive Jeanette is a twenty-four-foot cypress vessel built in 1926 by Lutcher and Moore Cypress Lumber Company. It was placed on the National Register of Historic Places on October 3, 1991. It bears no relation to the four-masted schooner which was sunk north of Milwaukee in 1905.

See also
 National Register of Historic Places listings in St. James Parish, Louisiana

References

St. James Parish, Louisiana
National Register of Historic Places in St. James Parish, Louisiana
Ships on the National Register of Historic Places in Louisiana